Charles W. 'Chuck' Larson Jr. (born April 1, 1968, in Newton, Iowa) is the former Ambassador Extraordinary and Plenipotentiary of the US to the Republic of Latvia.  Prior to his appointment, Ambassador Larson was the Iowa State Senator from the 19th District from 2003–2007, was a member of the Iowa House of Representatives from 1993-2001, and is a former chairman of the Republican Party of Iowa.  He was succeeded in the Iowa Senate by Democrat Rob Hogg.

During his most recent term of office, Larson served on several committees in the Iowa Senate – the Commerce committee; the Education committee; the Judiciary committee; the Ways and Means committee; and the Ethics committee, where he was co-chair. In 2003, President George W. Bush appointed Larson to the President's Advisory Commission for Drug Free Communities, on which he continues to serve.

On November 30, 2007, the White House announced that Larson would be nominated to become Ambassador Extraordinary and Plenipotentiary of the US to the Republic of Latvia in 2008, replacing Catherine Todd Bailey.

In May 2008, Latvian President Valdis Zatlers awarded Ambassador Larson the Order of the Three Stars, which is Latvia's highest award for his service to the country.

In June 2009, President Barack Obama announced he was nominating Judith Gail Garber to replace Larson as U.S. Ambassador to Latvia.

Work

Chuck served on the Pearl Mutual Fund board of directors from 2006 until his appointment. He prosecuted as an assistant county attorney in Jones County, Iowa from 1997 to 1999. He was then named General Counsel for the ESCO Group, a Marion, Iowa, technology services firm with more than 250 employees. He served in this capacity until 2006. He was also chairman of the Republican Party of Iowa from 2001 to 2005 and served on U.S. Senator John McCain's presidential kitchen cabinet.

Ambassador Larson is one of the founding partners of Larson Shannahan and Slifka group (LS2group), a bipartisan public affairs firm in Des Moines, IA, whose projects range from local to international covering a diverse groups of sectors.

Education

Ambassador Larson is a 1992 graduate of the University of Iowa, where he received his Bachelor of Arts degree in economics. He graduated with honors and distinction and is a member of the Phi Beta Kappa Society honors society. In 1996, Ambassador Larson received his Juris Doctor degree with distinction from the University College of Law.

Military service

Ambassador Larson served as a major in the U.S. Army Reserves spending a year in Iraq during Operation Iraqi Freedom and was awarded a Bronze Star Medal for meritorious service in combat and the Combat Action Badge.

In January 2008, Ambassador Larson's book Heroes Among Us, was released by Penguin Publishing, profiling 29 heroes from the War on Terrorism.

References

External links 
 Larson on Project Vote Smart
 Larson's Capitol Web Address
 

Republican Party Iowa state senators
Living people
Ambassadors of the United States to Latvia
1968 births
People from Newton, Iowa
People from Fremont County, Iowa
Iowa lawyers
Republican Party members of the Iowa House of Representatives